Murat Ersen (born 3 August 1984) known by the stage name Muhabbet is a Turkish-German singer. He is also popular and famous in Turkey and Northern Cyprus.

Discography

Albums

Singles 

Featured in

Filmography

External links

Official website

1984 births
Living people
German people of Turkish descent
21st-century German  male  singers